Stare At is the second studio album released by singer Ken Hirai under the label Sony Records. Now released by DefStar Records (Sony Music Group).  It was released on December 1, 1996.

Overview
The album includes the singles, Yokogao, Doshaburi, and  Stay with Me. Hirai wrote and composed most of the songs himself. He revealed that after the album was complete, it would be released late in the end of the year.

Track list
Kanashii no wa Kimi dake ja nai (4:55)
Written and composed by Ken Hirai. Arranged by Joe Rinoie and Masaki Suzukawa.
Stage (4:42)
Written and composed by Ken Hirai. Arranged by Joe Rinoie and Masaki Suzukawa.
Stay with Me (4:58)
Written by Ken Hirai. Composed by Joe Rinoie. Arranged by Joe Rinoie and Masaki Suzukawa.
Naze Darou (4:59)
Written and composed by Ken Hirai. Arranged by Satoshi Takebe.
Aitaiyo (5:56)
Written and composed by Ken Hirai. Arranged by Satoshi Takebe.
Kimi ga Wakaranai (5:04)
Written by Ken Hirai. Composed by Ken Hirai and Shun Yamashita. Arranged by Joe Rinoie and Masaki Suzukawa.
Kusareen (5:15)
Written and composed by Ken Hirai. Arranged by Chokkoku.
Yokogao (5:49)
Written and composed by Ken Hirai. Arranged by Akihisa Matsuura.
Naite Waratte (4:57)
Written and composed by Ken Hirai. Arranged by Chokkoku.
Doshaburi(5:20)
Written and composed by Ken Hirai. Arranged by Akihisa Matsuura.
Yubi-kiri (7:36)
Written and composed by Ken Hirai. Arranged by Nobuo Kashima.
Kyatchi Bōru (3:14)
Written and composed by Ken Hirai. Arranged by Hideki Kajino.

1996 albums
Ken Hirai albums